
AD 1 or 1 CE was the epoch year for the Anno Domini (AD) Christian calendar era and also the 1st year of the Common Era (CE) and the 1st millennium and of the 1st century of the Christian and the common era. It was a common year starting on Saturday or Sunday, a common year starting on Saturday by the proleptic Julian calendar, and a common year starting on Monday by the proleptic Gregorian calendar. In the Roman Empire, AD 1 was known as the Year of the Consulship of Caesar and Paullus, named after Roman consuls Gaius Caesar and Lucius Aemilius Paullus, and less frequently, as year AUC 754 (see ab urbe condita) within the Roman Empire. The denomination "AD 1" for this year has been in consistent use since the mid-medieval period when the Anno Domini (AD) calendar era became the prevalent method in Europe for naming years. It was the beginning of the Christian era/common era. The preceding year is 1 BC; there is no year 0 in this numbering scheme. The Anno Domini dating system was devised in AD 525 by Dionysius Exiguus.

The Julian calendar, a 45 BC reform of the Roman calendar, was the calendar used by Rome in AD 1.

Events

By place

Roman Empire 
 Tiberius, under order of Emperor Augustus, quells revolts in Germania (AD 1–5).

Asia 
 Confucius is given his first royal title (posthumous name) of Baocheng Xuan Ni Gong.

By topic

Religion 
 Birth of Jesus, as assigned by Dionysius Exiguus in his anno Domini era according to at least one scholar. However, most scholars think that Dionysius placed the birth of Jesus in the previous year, 1 BC. Furthermore, most modern scholars do not consider Dionysius' calculations authoritative, placing the event several years earlier (see Chronology of Jesus).

Births 
 Sextus Afranius Burrus, Roman praetorian prefect (d. AD 62)
 Izates II, King of Adiabene (d. AD 54)

Deaths 
 Amanishakheto, queen of Kush (Nubia)

Gallery

References

Sources

Footnotes 

 

als:0er#Johr 1